Cla(i)re Brown may refer to:

Clare Rewcastle Brown (born 1959), British journalist
Claire Brown, character in Seduced by Madness
Claire Brown, character in Aquamarine (film)

See also
Claire Ross-Brown (born 1972), English actress
Clair Brown (born 1946), American economist
Clara Brown (disambiguation)